Kazarma (Qaźarma) is a rural locality (a selo) in Starotukmaklinsky Selsoviet, Kushnarenkovsky District, Bashkortostan, Russia. The population was 510 as of 2010. There are 5 streets.

Geography 
Kazarma is located 28 km south of Kushnarenkovo (the district's administrative centre) by road. Uguzevo is the nearest rural locality.

References 

Rural localities in Kushnarenkovsky District